Currency manipulator is a designation applied by United States government authorities, such as the United States Department of the Treasury, to countries that engage in what is called “unfair currency practices” that give them a trade advantage. Such practices may be currency intervention or monetary policy in which a central bank buys or sells foreign currency in exchange for domestic currency, generally with the intention of influencing the exchange rate and commercial policy. Policymakers may have different reasons for currency intervention, such as controlling inflation, maintaining international competitiveness, or financial stability. In many cases, the central bank weakens its own currency to subsidize exports and raise the price of imports, sometimes by as much as 30-40%, and it is thereby a method of protectionism. Currency manipulation is not necessarily easy to identify and some people have considered quantitative easing to be a form of currency manipulation.

Under the 1988 Omnibus Foreign Trade and Competitiveness Act, the United States Secretary of the Treasury is required to "analyze on an annual basis the exchange rate policies of foreign countries … and consider whether countries manipulate the exchange rate between their currency and the United States dollar for purposes of preventing effective balance of payments adjustments or gaining unfair competitive advantage in international trade" and that "If the Secretary considers that such manipulation is occurring with respect to countries that (1) have material global current account surpluses; and (2) have significant bilateral trade surpluses with the United States, the Secretary of the Treasury shall take action to initiate negotiations with such foreign countries on an expedited basis, in the International Monetary Fund or bilaterally, for the purpose of ensuring that such countries regularly and promptly adjust the rate of exchange between their currencies and the United States dollar to permit effective balance of payments".

A designated currency manipulator can be excluded from U.S. government procurement contracts.

According to the Trade Facilitation and Trade Enforcement Act of 2015, the Secretary of the Treasury must publish a semi-annual report in which the developments in international economic and exchange rate policies are reviewed. If a country is labeled a currency manipulator under this Act, "The President, through Treasury, shall take specified remedial action against any such countries that fail to adopt policies to correct the undervaluation of their currency and trade surplus with the United States."

It has been argued that the concept of "currency manipulation" is hypocritical, given that the US already has the privilege of having the main reserve currency of the world, which is needed for international trade. Massive interventions of the Federal Reserve since the financial crisis of 2008, such as Quantitative Easing and interventions in the REPO market have been cited as alleged examples of the U.S.. itself engaging in currency manipulation.

Designations under the 1988 Act
Since the 1988 Act was enacted, the United States Department of the Treasury has designated the following countries as currency manipulators: 

 South Korea in 1988.
 Taiwan in 1988 and again in 1992.
 China from 1992 to 1994. 
 India was added to the list in 2017 for ‘questionable foreign exchange policies’. It had stated that India had increased its purchases of foreign exchange over the last three quarters of 2017, although the rupee still rose in value. India's net purchases of foreign exchange in 2017 as a whole totalled $56 billion (2.2% of GDP). 

In May 2019, the US Treasury removed India and Switzerland from its currency monitoring list but China, Japan, South Korea, Germany, Italy, Ireland, Singapore, Malaysia, and Vietnam remained on the list. India was removed from the list after it met one of the three criteria necessary for inclusion on the monitoring list, namely, a significant bilateral surplus with the US. India also reduced its level of foreign exchange reserves, to 0.2% of GDP. An analysis by The Economist in 2017 noted that Switzerland has been manipulating its currency more than China since 2009 and Taiwan and South Korea have been doing so since 2014.

 In August 2019, the Trump administration, as part of the China–United States trade war, again designated China a currency manipulator, a designation not supported by the International Monetary Fund. The designation against China was withdrawn in January 2020 after China agreed to refrain from devaluing its currency to make its own goods cheaper for foreign buyers. The two countries are soon to sign a "Phase 1 U.S.-China trade agreement" that includes a provision that prevents China from manipulating its currency to gain trade advantages.

 In December 2020, the Trump administration designated Switzerland and Vietnam  as currency manipulators. In April 2021, the Biden Administration redesignated Vietnam and Switzerland; they were removed from the currency manipulator list and moved to enhanced monitoring list.

In December 2020, India, Thailand, and Taiwan were added to the monitoring list. China, Japan, South Korea, Germany, Italy, Singapore and Malaysia continued to be on the list.

Evaluation criteria

Impact on manufacturing
Currency manipulation has a disproportionate effect on the secondary sector of the economy and lobbyists of the U.S. manufacturing sector have regularly referred to China as a currency manipulator. A 2013 analysis by Carlos D. Ramirez found that "an increase of one percentage point in the share of congressional district labor force in manufacturing is associated with a 19.6% increase in the likelihood that the district legislator will label Mainland China a currency manipulator".

Reactions
In 2020, the COVID-19 pandemic has exacerbated U.S. trade deficits with a number of nations, including Switzerland and Vietnam. While the Swiss National Bank continued to practice currency interventions to stop the influx of foreign money during economic crisis, the State Bank of Vietnam as well said that its foreign exchange rate policy "is a way to contain inflation, ensure macro stability and not to create an unfair trade advantage".  A senior U.S. treasury official said the US aimed “to resolve our issues” with Vietnam and Switzerland within a year. He added that the Biden administration had not been briefed on the issue, and that "they are not implicated in this."

After the Biden Administration moved Switzerland, Vietnam and Taiwan to an enhanced engagement status in April 2021, US treasury officials confirmed that the COVID-19 pandemic has caused massive trade and capital flow distortions, increasing the necessity for currency interventions in those export-oriented countries. Taiwanese and Vietnamese officials welcomed the move not to categorize them as currency manipulators, since US authorities understood their “special situation”. Both the State Bank of Vietnam and the Swiss National Bank would continue to practice currency interventions to contain inflation, and ensure macro-economic stability.

See also 
Protectionism

References

Currency
Currency traders
Foreign exchange market
Trade policy